Suchitoto is a municipality in the Department of Cuscatlán, El Salvador that has seen continuous human habitation long before Spanish colonization. Within its municipal territory, Suchitoto holds the site of the original founding of the Villa of San Salvador in 1528 that existed for a short time before the site was abandoned. In more recent times, the municipality has prospered even after the severe effects of civil war in El Salvador that lasted between 1980 - 1992 and saw the population of Suchitoto decrease from 34,101 people in 1971 to 13,850 by 1992. It has become an important tourist destination partly due to its well conserved colonial architecture and cobblestone roads that provide a sense of Spanish colonial living. This rise in tourism has attracted service sector businesses to open up in the small city including hostels, restaurants, and picturesque cafes. As a result of tourism, many arts and cultural spaces have opened up in Suchitoto that are also providing positive alternative opportunities for youth in the community. According to the 2007 Official Census, the small city has a population of 24,786 people with 7,654 people living in the urban area and 17,132 people living in the rural communities.

History

The Lost Cantons of Suchitoto & The Cerron Grande Hydroelectric Dam 

What is known today as Lake Suchitlán, a man-made lake, was formed in the mid-1970s as a result of the construction of the Cerron Grande Hydroelectric Dam. It was a project initiated by the central federal government of El Salvador to produce hydro electricity for the country. As a result of the flooding associated with the project, 13,339 people were internally displaced from their family homes and lands, with around 9,000 people relocating to other communities and the rest receiving a small lump sum of money for their properties. The project affected four Departments, 1.Chalatenango, 2.Cuscatlan, 3.San Salvador, and 4.Cabanas, with the Department of Chalatenango seeing the most municipalities affected including Tejutla, El Paraiso, San Rafael, Santa Rita, Chalatenango, Azacualpa, San Francisco Lempa, San Luis del Carmen, and Potonico; San Salvador seeing the municipality of El Paisnal affected, and Cuscatlan seeing the municipality of Suchitoto affected.

The project was initiated on August 4, 1972, by the newly elected government of former President Arturo Armando Molina who had discussed the project as part of his government's platform. The project was to create a dam on the Rio Lempa where two Francis turbines, with a capacity to produce 67.5 MW each, would be constructed as additions to the two turbine system already built on the Rio Guajoyo and Rio Lempa. The project was advertised as the best resource for the country's energy problem, and was to be built 22 kilometres upstream from the Central dam on the Rio Lempa, between the municipality of Potonico, Chalatenango and Jutiapa, Cabanas. As a result of this construction, 2,180 million cubic metres of water flooded an area of around 13,500 hectares of land and formed the 135 kilometres squared artificial lake called Lago Suchitlan. As a result of the lake, 24 archaeological sites were flooded and multiple cantons and caserios or hamlets disappeared, including Canton El Tablon and Canton San Juan in Suchitoto.

Suchitoto is a Sister City of Prescott, Arizona.

References

Municipalities of the Cuscatlán Department